Max Dorien Hooper (20 November 1934 – 10 February 2017) was an English naturalist and the inventor of "Hooper's rule", which is used to estimate the age of a hedgerow.

He received the Peter Scott Memorial Award.

Selected publications
Hedges. Collins New Naturalist series (With Ernie Pollard & Norman Moore)
Nature Day and Night (With Richard Adams)
Nature Through the Seasons (With Richard Adams)

References

1934 births
2017 deaths
People from Leytonstone
People educated at Sir George Monoux College
English naturalists
English botanists
English botanical writers
Alumni of University College London
Academics of Wye College